These are the films shown at the 12th New York Underground Film Festival, held from March 9–15, 2005

See also
 New York Underground Film Festival site
 2005 Festival Archive

New York Underground Film Festival
New York Underground Film Festival, 2005
Underground Film Festival
New York Underground Film
2005 in American cinema